In mathematics, the multiple gamma function  is a generalization of the Euler gamma function and the Barnes G-function.

Double gamma functions  are closely related to the q-gamma function, and triple gamma functions  are related to the elliptic gamma function.

Definition
For , let 

where  is the Barnes zeta function. (This differs by a constant from Barnes's original definition.)

Properties
It has poles at for non-negative integers . These poles are simple unless some of them coincide. Up to multiplication by the exponential of a polynomial,  is the unique meromorphic function of finite order with these zeros and poles.

Infinite product representation
The multiple gamma function has an infinite product representation that makes it manifest that it is meromorphic, and that also makes the positions of its poles manifest. In the case of the double gamma function, this representation is 

where we define the -independent coefficients

Reduction to the Barnes G-function

The double gamma function with parameters  obeys the relations 

It is related to the Barnes G-function by

The double gamma function and conformal field theory

is invariant under , and obeys the relations

For , it has the integral representation

From the function , we define the double Sine function  and the Upsilon function  by

These functions obey the relations 

For  they have the integral representations

The functions  and  appear in correlation functions of two-dimensional conformal field theory, with the parameter  being related to the central charge of the underlying Virasoro algebra. In particular, the three-point function of Liouville theory is written in terms of the function .

References

Further reading

Gamma and related functions